Angel Escobedo (born January 12, 1987) is an American former folkstyle and freestyle wrestler, and is the head wrestling coach at Indiana University.  Escobedo won an NCAA Division I championship in 2008, and placed fifth in the world in 2013.

Early life
Escobedo is from Griffith, Indiana.

College career
Escobedo competed for the wrestling team at Indiana University.  While there, he won an NCAA Division I championship, and placed in the top five nationwide all four years he competed.  Escobedo was the first wrestler from Indiana University to ever place in the top eight four times.

Freestyle career
At the 2013 World Team Trials Escobedo finished 2nd, but was promoted to compete in the World Championships when Obe Blanc failed a drug test.

At the 2013 World Wrestling Championships Escobedo advanced to the bronze medal match in the 55 kg division. Escobedo ultimately lost in the bronze medal match by one point to Sezar Akgül of Turkey.

Match results

! colspan="7"|World Championships Matches
|-
!  Res.
!  Record
!  Opponent
!  Score
!  Date
!  Event
!  Location
|-
! style=background:white colspan=7 |
|-
|Loss
|3-2
|align=left| Sezar Akgül
|style="font-size:88%"|1-2
|style="font-size:88%" rowspan=5|September 16, 2013
|style="font-size:88%" rowspan=5|2013 World Wrestling Championships
|style="text-align:left;font-size:88%;" rowspan=6| Budapest, Hungary
|-
|Win
|3-1
|align=left| Zoheir El-Ouarraqe
|style="font-size:88%"|8-2
|-
|Loss
|2-1
|align=left| Amit Kumar Dahiya
|style="font-size:88%"|0-6
|-
|Win
|2-0
|align=left| Róbert Kardos
|style="font-size:88%"|8-0
|-
|Win
|1-0
|align=left| Andrei Dukov
|style="font-size:88%"|6-0

Awards and honors

2015
 Pan American Games
 Dave Schultz Memorial International
2013
 Stepan Sargsyan Tournament
2011
 New York Athletic Club International
 FILA Test Tournament
2010
 Golden Grand Prix
 NCAA Division I
 Big Ten Conference
2009
NCAA Division I All American
 Big Ten Conference
2008
 NCAA Division I
 Big Ten Conference
2007
NCAA Division I All American
 Big Ten Conference

References 

1987 births
Living people
Sportspeople from Indiana
Indiana Hoosiers wrestlers
Place of birth missing (living people)
People from Griffith, Indiana
Wrestlers at the 2015 Pan American Games
American male sport wrestlers
Pan American Games silver medalists for the United States
Pan American Games medalists in wrestling
American wrestling coaches
Medalists at the 2015 Pan American Games